The Nubia Z20 is an android smartphone which was launched globally on 14 October 2019.
It has two screens (on both sides of the phone) which can operate independently.

Specifications

Hardware and Design
The Z20 has an aluminum and glass construction. It is powered by the Qualcomm Snapdragon 855+ CPU and the Adreno 640 GPU. An AMOLED panel is used for both displays, with a 6.42-inch (163mm) 1080p 19.5:9 screen on the front and a smaller 5.1-inch (129.5mm) 720p 19:9 screen on the back. Both are protected by Gorilla Glass 5, and supports HDR10. It is available with 128 or 512 GB of non-expandable storage and 6 or 8 GB of RAM. A fingerprint sensor is located on both sides of the phone and is used to switch displays. The Z20 has a 4000mAh battery and can fast charge at up to 27W over USB-C. A triple camera setup is used, with a 48 MP main lens, a 16 MP ultrawide lens, and an 8 MP telephoto lens. The main lens has PDAF and OIS, with a red accent ring. It is capable of recording 1080p or 4K video at either 30 or 60 fps, and can also shoot 8K at 15 fps and 720p ultra slow-motion at 1920fps. A dual-LED flash is located to the left of the camera module, with another single-LED flash to the right. The device is available in Twilight Blue and Diamond Black.

Software 
The Z20 runs on Nubia UI 7, which is based on Android 9.0 "Pie".

References

Android (operating system) devices
Smartphones
Mobile phones introduced in 2019
Mobile phones with multiple rear cameras
Dual screen phone
Mobile phones with 8K video recording